SIIMA Award for Best Cinematographer – Telugu is presented by Vibri media group as part of its annual South Indian International Movie Awards, for the best cinematography done by a person in Telugu films. The award was first given in 2012 for films released in 2011.

Winners

Nominations 

 2011: P. R. K. Raju – Sri Rama Rajyam
 Vijay K Chakravarhy – Mr. Perfect
 Venkat Prasad – 100% Love
 K. V. Guhan – Dookudu
 Soundar Rajan – Anaganaga O Dheerudu
 2012: K. K. Senthil Kumar – Eega
 Shyam K. Naidu – Businessman
 Jayanan Vincent – Gabbar Singh
 P. C. Sreeram – Ishq
 Chota K. Naidu – Dhamarukam
 2013: Prasad Murella – Attarintiki Daredi
 Chota K. Naidu – Naayak
 K. V. Guhan – Seethamma Vakitlo Sirimalle Chettu
 Madhi – Mirchi
 Amol Rathod – Iddarammayilatho
 2014: R. Rathnavelu – 1: Nenokkadine
 Karthik Ghattamaneni – Karthikeya
 P. S. Vinod – Manam
 Manoj Paramahamsa– Race Gurram
 Madhi – Run Raja Run
 2015: K. K. Senthil Kumar – Baahubali: The Beginning
 2017: K. K. Senthil Kumar – Baahubali 2: The Conclusion
 2018:R. Rathnavelu – Rangasthalam
 Dani Sanclez-Lopez – Mahanati
 George C Williams – Tholi Prema
 Jay Kay – Padi Padi Leche Manasu
 Shaneil Deo – Goodachari
 2019: Sanu Varghese – Jersey
 R. Rathnavelu – Sye Raa Narasimha Reddy
 K. U. Mohanan – Maharshi
 Raj Thota – ISmart Shankar
 R. Madhi – Saaho
2020: R. Rathnavelu – Sarileru Neekevvaru
P. S. Vinod – Ala Vaikunthapurramuloo
P. G. Vinda – V
Venkat C. Dilip – Solo Brathuke So Better
Sai Sriram – Bheeshma
 2021: C. Ram Prasad – Akhanda
 Mirosław Kuba Brożek – Pushpa: The Rise
 G. K. Vishnu – Krack
 Siddam Manohar – Jathi Ratnalu
 Shamdat – Uppena
 Shyam K. Naidu – Narappa

See also 

 Tollywood

References 

South Indian International Movie Awards
South Indian International Movie Awards winners
Awards for best cinematography